Borsellino is an Italian surname.

Notable people with this surname include:

Paolo Borsellino (1940–1992), a Sicilian judge and prosecuting magistrate who was assassinated
Raimondo Borsellino (1905–1998), a Sicilian politician who represented the Christian Democracy in the Constituent Assembly of Italy
Rita Borsellino (born 1945), a Sicilian anti-Mafia activist, politician and Member of the European Parliament
Rob Borsellino (1949–2006), an American newspaper columnist who worked for the Des Moines Register
Joey Borsellino, a wide receiver for the 2016 Western Illinois Leathernecks football team
John Borsellino, an alleged mafia hitman whose bullet-riddled body was found in a farmer's field in Illinois in the 1970s timeline of organized crime
Lewis Borsellino, a Chicago S&P pit trader who was the subject of the documentary, SOLD!:The Lewis Borsellino Story, by Tony Vitale

See also
Velodromo Paolo Borsellino, a multi-use stadium in Palermo, Italy
Falcone–Borsellino Airport (Italian: Aeroporto Falcone e Borsellino), an airport in Palermo
Gli angeli di Borsellino (The Angels of Borsellino), a 2003 Italian film about the assassination of Paolo Borsellino
Borsalino

Italian-language surnames